The Retail and Fast Food Workers Union (known as RAFFWU) is an Australian trade union for workers in the retail and fast food industries.

History
The Retail and Fast Food Workers Union was established in December 2016 as a response to increased dissatisfaction with the existing Shop, Distributive and Allied Employees Association (SDA). Earlier that year, industrial researcher Josh Cullinan had found that "dozens of SDA-negotiated deals that industrial relations lawyers now suspect would have failed the “better off” test if they’d been properly assessed by Fair Work", with the Sydney Morning Herald reporting "the amounts lost to workers are incalculable, they are certainly in the billions." Josh Cullinan became RAFFWU's inaugural Secretary, having over 15 years' experience with unionism and worker representation, especially in the National Tertiary Education Union.

In May 2020, the Victorian branch of the Construction, Forestry, Maritime, Mining and Energy Union endorsed the union over the SDA. In 2022, RAFFWU delegate Stephen Bates became the first RAFFWU affiliated politician after being elected to the House of Representatives.

Industrial action

Coles Supermarkets
Following Josh Cullinan's success with the Hart decision in which the Fair Work Commission rejected the 2014 EBA due to its failure to pass the Better Off Overall Test or "BOOT" that an agreement must meet when compared to the relevant award. With the 2014 agreement rejected, Coles employees were reverted to the 2011 agreement but with an undertaking by Coles that the 2014 base rate of pay would not be decreased. RAFFWU's first negotiations for a new enterprise agreement began with serving claims on Coles Supermarkets for the return of all General Retail Award minimum rights such as penalty loadings during unsociable hours that were stripped in prior agreements and an understanding that it would not accept any agreement that was inferior to the award.

These negotiations were put to a halt when in May 2017 a self-represented Coles night fill worker, applied to the Fair Work Commission to have the 2011 agreement terminated on the same basis as the 2014 agreement as it was alleged to also contain similar below-award levels of pay. During this commission process Coles revealed that up to 60% of its workforce would be better off under the minimum rates of the award structure than the 2011 agreement, despite this admission, both the SDA and the AWU assisted Coles in its defence of the agreement. The termination was settled in November 2017 with Coles agreeing to fast-track a vote on a newly proposed enterprise agreement including the return of all award penalty rates to be paid between the period of a successful vote and the agreement taking effect. Despite having been underpaid, due to the settlement of the case outside of the Commission, workers would not be entitled to back pay for the period underpaid.

With a ballot held in February 2018, RAFFWU encouraged its members to vote against the agreement. It raised concerns over concessions made by the SDA including that it didn't require back pay for any period prior that was underpaid, that by saving the existing base rate for current employees and paying new employees just 55¢ above the minimum wage would create a two-tiered workforce and throw the security of existing employees into jeopardy as well as locking in future changes and mirroring award penalty rates that were scheduled to lower on 1 July 2018, despite the SDA's public campaign against these cuts to penalty rates by the Fair Work Commission.

On the 26th of February, the vote was successful with an approval rating of 90% despite only 48,000 or just 61% of the Coles workforce turning out to vote. The agreement included a $475 sign-on payment for full-time workers, pro-rated for part-time employees. RAFFWU continued to raise further concerns that the agreement included provisions for "standing consent" for part-time employees to work additional hours and to be paid at the ordinary rate rather than the applicable overtime rate. It also suggested that by incorporating the $1.50 laundry allowance into the hourly rate, that new employees would effectively only be receiving an additional 5¢ per hour on the minimum wage.

Despite these concerns, the agreement was approved in April 2018 by the Fair Work Commission. RAFFWU's Secretary Josh Cullinan commented that "It has taken a long time but we are delighted that workers will start seeing the benefits of our campaign. We believe the agreement should have been better but there is substantial improvement".

In August 2018, The Age reported that Coles employees working unsociable hours received pay rises of up to 20% or between $100 - $150 per week, due to the "scrapping of the cosy [SDA] union deal" that did not require Coles to pay the applicable penalty rates in the past.

Domino's Pizza
In August 2017, a Domino's Pizza delivery driver and RAFFWU member, applied to terminate the multiple expired enterprise agreements that covered those employed by Domino's Pizza within Australia. Under these agreements, delivery drivers weren't paid casual loading, penalty rates and received a driving allowance that was less than required under the Fast Food Award. In November 2017, the Fair Work Commission approved the termination of the enterprise agreement, resulting in Domino's employees being placed within the industry award within 12 weeks.

During that time, negotiations began between Domino's and the SDA for a new national enterprise agreement that was slated for a vote by employees in early January 2018. The vote was delayed by a week due to Dominos failing "to negotiate in good faith" with the RAFFWU in this process.

The new agreement passed overwhelmingly by employees through an electronic ballot, and the agreement was returned to the FWC for approval. RAFFWU raised concerns about the agreement as it traded "fixed start and finish times" for part-time employees for a two-cent pay rise. In March 2018, the enterprise agreement was abandoned and withdrawn by Domino's, who decided to continue to cover their employees under the industry Fast Food Award.

McDonald's
In late December 2018 and January 2019, RAFFWU began a major campaign in improving McDonald's workers conditions. The campaign revolved around the company's unlawful denial of employees' 10-minute breaks. Several McDonald's stores claimed that workers could either access drinking and toilet facilities at this time or take their allocated break. RAFFWU responded that this contravened the negotiated agreement and that workers had the right to drink water or go to the toilet whenever they wished.

Following threats by senior management of Tantex Holdings, the franchisee of 6 McDonald's stores across the Brisbane CBD, towards staff against sharing union posts on social media, RAFFWU organised a "historic" protest in front of the Myer Centre McDonald's in Brisbane, demanding the "basic human right" that is drinking water.

McDonald's and RAFFWU were engaged in enterprise agreement negotiations from late 2018 to mid-2019, with RAFFWU taking 6 members and activists to negotiations. Through negotiations McDonald's was not able to offer a deal RAFFWU was happy with. As such the deal put up to vote on by McDonald's was not supported by RAFFWU who campaigned for a 'NO' vote. Despite the SDA, a much larger union, supporting the deal RAFFWU's campaign was able to break records in facilitating the largest NO vote to an enterprise agreement in Australian history.

In mid-2019 RAFFWU member Xavier Kelly filed with the fairwork commission and application for the backdated termination of the 'Mcdonald's Australia Enterprise Agreement 2013'

Shortly after McDonald's applied to the FWC for the approval of the 'McDonald's Enterprise Agreement 2019' despite the vast amount of staff that voted NO.

McDonald's withdrew their application a few weeks later when it became apparent the FWC would not approve it.

In late 2019, the Fairwork commission ruled on the termination case brought forth by Xavier Kelly, they decided to terminate the agreement but without backpay. Ruling it would be "unjust" to force McDonald's to pay back stolen wages.

In November 2019 RAFFWU organised their first training session for McDonald's activists. The weekend focused around tackling OHS issues in the workplace.

In 2019 RAFFWU member Chiara Stains with the support of RAFFWU commenced litigation against Tantex holdings for breach of numerous workplace and human rights. In September 2020 the Federal Court ruled in favour of Chiara and RAFFWU and ruled that workers have the legal right to take toilet breaks and drink water, which Tantex had threatened to withhold in a breach of employee's workplace rights. Chiara receive $800 in lost breaks and $1000 compensation, and the McDonald's franchisee was fined $82,000 in total. RAFFWU is now working with SHINE Lawyers to pursue a class action lawsuit against McDonald's, alleging systematic denial of water and toilet breaks and seeking eligible workers to register.

Other industrial action
In 2017, RAFFWU was involved in terminating expired enterprise and Workchoices era agreements covering Bakers Delight employees, elevating those affected to the modern award and restoring minimum rates of pay and other entitlements. In the same year, RAFFWU also terminated expired agreements at several IGA supermarkets.

In 2021, RAFFWU lead workers at Sydney bookstore 'Better Read Than Dead' in protected industrial action in pursuit of an Enterprise Bargaining Agreement, and workers walked off the job in the first retail protected action in decades. After several days of action the campaign was successful and management agreed to an in-principle agreement.

Industrial approach
RAFFWU is highly critical of a number of aspects of the SDA which covers the same industries. Some of these practices include the negotiation of workplace agreements which reduced wages below Award rates, the former's lack of political independence, its socially conservative stances towards abortion and same-sex marriage, as well as its perceived "undemocratic" and "top-down" nature.

RAFFWU is currently registered as an incorporated association, not an employee organisation, due to "industry coverage restrictions". As such, RAFFWU is currently unable to obtain Right of Entry permits. RAFFWU is able to be heard in dealings with the Fair Work Commission in numerous proceedings in its own right including as bargaining representative and as a concerned union in Award Review proceedings. They are also able to represent employees in an individual capacity and have been involved in the negotiation and termination of many enterprise bargaining agreements which involved hearings in the Fair Work Commission.

In 2020, the Federal Court of Australia found RAFFWU acted in the national interest when prosecuting the Tantex litigation.

References

Trade unions in Australia
Retail trade unions
Retailing in Australia
2016 establishments in Australia